The 2008 National Hurling League, known for sponsorship reasons as the Allianz National Hurling League, was the 77th edition of the National Hurling League (NHL), an annual hurling competition for the GAA county teams. Tipperary won the league, beating Galway in the final. The tournament saw the first appearance of Fingal and South Down as "county" teams in the NHL.

Format
The 2008 format of the National Hurling League was a new system consisting of four divisions. There are thirty-four teams competing: Divisions One and Two have twelve teams in each, and there are five teams in Divisions Three and Four.

Division One
Division One is made up of two groups of six teams. Each team plays all the others in their group once. The two group winners receive a semi-final spot; second and third in each group play in the quarter-finals. The winners of the final are the 2008 NHL champions.

Division Two
Division Two is made up of two groups of six teams. Each team plays all the others in their group once. The top two in each group enter the semi-finals.

Division Three
Five teams play in Division Three. Each team plays all the others once. The top two teams contest the Division Three final.

Division Four
Five teams play in Division Four. Each team plays all the others once. The top two teams contest the Division Four final.

Division 1A

Waterford came into the season as defending champions of the 2007 season. Laois entered Division 1 as the promoted team.

On 20 April 2008, Tipperary won the title after a 3-18 to 3-16 win over Galway. It was their first league title since 2001 and their 19th National League title overall.

Wexford, Antrim, Laois and Offaly were the bottom-placed teams of their respective groups and were relegated to a newly-structured Division 2 for the 2009 league.

Galway's Ger Farragher was the Division 1 top scorer with 4-53. Tipperary's Brendan Cummins and Galway's James Skehill were the top goalkeepers having kept 3 clean sheets.

Structure

A total of 12 teams contested the top division of the league, including 11 sides from the 2006 season and one promoted from the 2006 National League Division 2. On 29 April 2007, Laois earned promotion from the 2007 National League Division 2 after a one-year absence from the top flight. They were crowned Division 2 champions after beating Wicklow. They replaced Down who were relegated to Division 2 at the end of the previous season.

The 12 teams in Division 1 were divided into two groups of six team - 1A and 1B. Each team played all the others in its group once, earning 2 points for a win and 1 for a draw. The first-placed teams in 1A and 1B advanced to the league semi-finals. The second and third-placed teams in 1A and 1B advanced to the league quarter-finals.

Division 1A table

Group stage

Division 1B

Division 1B table

Group stage

Division 1 Knockout

Play-off

Quarter-finals

Semi-finals

Final

Top scorers

Overall

Single game

Clean sheets

Division 2

Division 2A

Division 2B

Results

Knock-out stage

Division 3

Division 3

Knock-out stage

Division 4

Division 4

Knock-out stage

2009 structure

Division One (8 teams) to consist of the top four teams in each of 1A and 1B in 2008.
Division Two (8 teams) to consist of the fifth- and sixth-placed in each of 1A and 1B, and the top two teams in each of 2A and 2B, in 2008.
Division Three (12 teams) to consist of the 3rd-6th teams in each of 2A and 2B, and the top four in Division 3, in 2008.
Division Four (6 teams) to consist of fifth-placed team in Division 3, and all teams in Division 4

References

External links
2008 Fixtures
Results and final tables from the official GAA website

 
National Hurling League seasons